Harland Bartholomew (September 14, 1889 – December 2, 1989) was the first full-time urban planner employed by an American city. A civil engineer by training, Harland was a planner with St. Louis, Missouri, for 37 years. His work and teachings were widely influential, particularly on the use of government to enforce racial segregation in land use.

Early life and education
Bartholomew was born in Stoneham, Massachusetts, on September 14, 1889. He moved to New York City when he was 15 and attended Erasmus High School in Brooklyn. He completed two years of a civil engineering degree at Rutgers University but ran out of money to continue its completion. He was later awarded an honorary degree in civil engineering from Rutgers University in 1921. In 1912, he began working with E.P. Goodrich, a civil engineering firm that was a strong advocate for the efficient planning of cities. His work with Goodrich consisted principally of conducting traffic counts on bridges, a task that Bartholomew found dreary but that prepared him for a life of planning around infrastructure and automobility.

Career
In 1914, the Newark, New Jersey plan commission retained Bartholomew as the first full-time, public-sector city planner in the U.S. The following year, prominent civic reform advocate Luther Ely Smith, on the advice of the architect Henry Wright, recruited Bartholomew to serve as the first planner of St. Louis, Missouri. He served in that capacity until 1950. In 1917, Bartholomew was a founding member of the American City Planning Institute and headed one of the largest planning consulting firms in the United States. In 1919, he established Harland Bartholomew and Associates; he served as its chairman until his retirement in 1962.

From 1918 to 1956, Bartholomew taught civic design at the University of Illinois and made substantial contributions to the scholarly and practice literature in city planning.  In 1932, he completed his landmark study Urban Land Uses, published by Harvard University Press in the City Planning series edited by Theodora and Charles Hubbard. Bartholomew also published dozens of studies and articles in venues including the City Planning Conference Proceedings, American City, The "Annals of the American Academy of Social and Political Science", American Civic Annual, City Planning, the "Journal of Land and Public Utility Economics", and the National Conference on City Planning Bulletin. His writing covered a wide range of practices. He wrote on topics such as the theory and practice of zoning, street widening, cost distribution, placement of railroads, easements, federal buildings in cities, growth controls, economic disintegration, subdivision layout, slum clearance, metropolitan and regional planning, and the role of neighborhoods in the plan process.

Bartholomew was appointed to Federal planning committees by three U.S. presidents: Herbert Hoover, Franklin D. Roosevelt, and Dwight D. Eisenhower.  His career was noted particularly by the Eisenhower administration for his work on the Washington Metro, as chairman of the National Capital Planning Commission, and as a leading advocate of society-first planning for freeways. 

Many of Bartholomew's views are discredited today. For example, he pioneered urban renewal through eminent domain in 1938 to clear the St. Louis Waterfront for the Gateway Arch National Park, then known as the Jefferson National Expansion Memorial.  He advanced the concept of identifying "obsolete neighborhoods" through cost accounting (amount of taxes garnered versus city services expended), and was a major advocate for functional single-use zoning and for automobile-oriented planning.

Racial segregation
In St. Louis, Bartholomew used planning to maintain racial segregation in cooperation with local realtor associations. In several other cities, Bartholomew's planning was found to be in line with racial, social, and economic segregation. Bartholomew also drew upon racially inequitable metaphors in the 1947 St. Louis city plan to spur residents to accept the necessity of his planning recommendations. His exclusionary approach, if adopted, meant only whites would see the promising future he envisioned.

In St. Louis, Bartholomew said an important goal was to prevent movement "by colored people" into "finer residential districts." He estimated where Blacks were likely to live, and created restrictions to keep Blacks out of white areas.

Planning activities conducted 
 1911-1915 Newark, New Jersey, comprehensive plan
 1916-1920 St. Louis, Missouri, comprehensive plan
 1920 Hamilton, Ohio, comprehensive plan
 1920 Memphis, Tennessee, comprehensive plan
 1920-1921 Lansing, Michigan, comprehensive plan (link)
 1921-1922 Madison, Wisconsin, comprehensive plan
 1921-1922 Wichita, Kansas, comprehensive plan
 1922 Evansville, Indiana, comprehensive plan
 1924 Los Angeles, California, transportation plan
 1924 Chattanooga, Tennessee, transportation plan, parks and recreation plan
 1924 South Bend, Indiana, streets report (link)
 1925 Kenosha, Wisconsin, comprehensive plan
 1927 Fort Worth, Texas, street and transportation plan
 1927 Peoria, Illinois, comprehensive plan
 1927 Grand Rapids, Michigan. land use and transportation plan.
 1926-1930 Vancouver, British Columbia, comprehensive plan
 1928 Saint Louis County, Missouri, transportation plan
 1928 Glendale, California, comprehensive plan
 1929 Louisville, Kentucky, A Major Street Plan
 1929 Rochester, New York, comprehensive plan
 1930 San Antonio, Texas, comprehensive plan
 1930-1934 St.Louis Regional Plan
 1932 Louisville, Kentucky The Negro Housing Problem in Louisville
 1935 Williamsburg, Virginia, Colonial National Parkway tunnel
 1931-1939 Edited "Land Subdivision Manual", Manual 16 published by The American Society of Civil Engineer
 1940-1944 Interstate Highway System, Principles for locating highways in urban areas
 1953-1959 Transportation Plan, Washington, D.C.

See also 
Eldridge Lovelace
American Planning Association
City planning

References

External links
New York Times Obituary, December 7, 1989
 Article on how Harland Bartholomew laid the groundwork for the phenomenon we today disparagingly call urban sprawl Article uses the comprehensive plan for Rochester, New York, 1929 to show how road design contributed to sprawling development and inner city decay. Excellent original illustrations from the comprehensive report.
Article describing the long-term effects of Bartholomew's Urban Planning in Saint Louis City and County
 Bartholomew's plan for the city of Fort Worth, Texas
 http://archon.wulib.wustl.edu/?p=collections/findingaid&id=523
 http://blackfreedomwhitealliesredscare.org/gallery-experience/classic-viewing/race-and-segregation/housing-discrimination-in-louisville/

1889 births
1989 deaths
American centenarians
Men centenarians
American urban planners
People from St. Louis